Clarisa Belén Huber (born 22 December 1984) is an Argentine footballer who plays as a midfielder for Boca Juniors. She was a member of the Argentina women's national team. She also played futsal at Club El Porvenir, CA Atlanta and the Argentina women's national team.

Club career
Huber started her career in 1999 for futsal club El Porvenir. In 2003, she transferred to association football, signing for Boca Juniors and debuting with the Argentine national team, with which she played the 2003 and 2007 FIFA World Cups. In 2008, she moved to Spain to play for Prainsa Zaragoza.

Returning to Argentina in 2011, she subsequently focused in futsal, and she was the captain of the Argentine national team at the 2011 World Tournament.

Personal life
Huber is of Austrian descent.

References
Notes

Citations

External links
Clarisa Huber at FutbolEsta.com 

1984 births
Living people
Women's association football forwards
Argentine women's footballers
Sportspeople from Buenos Aires Province
People from Tandil
Argentine people of Austrian descent
Argentina women's international footballers
2003 FIFA Women's World Cup players
2007 FIFA Women's World Cup players
Boca Juniors (women) footballers
Primera División (women) players
Zaragoza CFF players
Argentine expatriate women's footballers
Argentine expatriate sportspeople in Spain
Expatriate women's footballers in Spain
Argentine women's futsal players
Lesbian sportswomen
LGBT association football players
Argentine LGBT sportspeople
Argentine lesbians